Piz Bacun is a mountain of the Bregaglia Range (Alps), overlooking Vicosoprano in the Swiss canton of Graubünden. It is located between the Lake Albigna and the Forno Glacier.

References

External links
 Piz Bacun on Hikr

Mountains of the Alps
Alpine three-thousanders
Mountains of Graubünden
Mountains of Switzerland
Bregaglia